Jalihal  is a village in the southern state of Karnataka, India. It is located in the Badami taluk of Bagalkot district in Karnataka.

Demographics
 India census, Jalihal had a population of 5169 with 2624 males and 2545 females.

See also
 Bagalkot
 Districts of Karnataka

References

External links
 http://Bagalkot.nic.in/

Villages in Bagalkot district